Reverse Deception: Organized Cyber Threat Counter-Exploitation investigates methods and criteria to address organizational responses to Advanced Persistent Threats and cyber deception. It details how to identify APTs and prioritize actions by applying skilled field-tested private and government sector processes and methods which often involves cyber deception.

Content

The book reviews most historical and significant malware: Titan Rain, Moonlight Maze, Stakkato and Stuxnet are reviewed in light of APT criteria. The exploitation's of the Stuxnet and these major cyber events are reviewed in an operational aspect. These exploits were so complex and were very expensive and that approaches an even less discussed concept that because the development of the APT is resource intensive, it is most often believed to be sponsored by a government in essence conducting an offensive action. In some countries this can be a crime while others consider it as an aggressive defensive technique.

The work contains four stories regarding deception and counter deception. These are explained to be fictionalized works from actual events which occurred somewhere in the law enforcement and intelligence world, but there is no way of vetting this and it is not clear if these works are rooted in US domestic or international work. The cases are varied and considered compelling by noted cyber critics and reviewers of this work.

The authors introduce the first theory for classifying a threat on the opportunistic-APT continuum as either persistent on non-persistent. The APT classifications and criteria are now widely used in the industry and are built off of an evaluation of these following criteria:

APT CRITERIA
 Objectives
 Timeliness
 Resources
 Risk tolerance (by the adversary)
 Skills and methods
 Actions
 Attack origination points
 Numbers involved in the attack
 Knowledge source

 Threat Intelligence
 Analysis of cyber espionage tactics contrasted with types of permissible countermeasures
 How to use deception and disinformation campaigns
 Case studies and real stories from the authors’ FBI, DOD, NSA, and private sector work.
 Value Chain Management
 Counter espionage and espionage
 Legal interpretations of capacities, limitations, and stipulations for assisting law enforcement investigations.

Authors
 Sean M. Bodmer, CISSP, CEH, is founder and chief technologist at Pragmatik IO Grouip, INC.
 Dr Max Kilger, Ph.D., is specialist in profiling and behavioral analysis of the black hat community and hackers. He is a founding member of the Honeynet Project, is currently on their board of directors, and serves as their chief membership officer and chief profiler.
 Gregory Carpenter, DrPH, CISM, is an adjunct professor at Northern Virginia CC, on the International Board of Advisors at the Mackenzie Institute, Advisory Board at EC-Council University and on the board of directors of ATNA Systems.
 Jade Jones, Juris Doctor with experience including information operations and space law. He is a civilian with the Department of Defense and a Navy JAG Commander in the U.S. Naval Reserves.

See also

 Advanced Persistent Threat
 The Art of War
  Asymmetric Dominance
 Byzantine Foothold
 Carl von Clausewitz
 Computer Network Defense
 Computer network operations
 Cyberwarfare
 Deception
 Honeypot
 Information Warfare
 Moonlight Maze
 On War
 Operation Aurora
 Simulated Reality
 Solar Sunrise
 Stakkato
 Stuxnet
 Sun Tzu 孫子
 Titan Rain

References

External links
 About the Authors
 Reverse Deception Radio

2012 non-fiction books
McGraw-Hill books
Computer security books